Anne Hollonds (born 1957) is the current Australian National Children's Commissioner. She was appointed to this position in November 2020. Prior to this role she was the Director of the Australian Institute of Family Studies. For more than 23 years Anne has been a Chief Executive Officer of government and non-government organisations focussed on policy, service delivery and research in health, education and social services, including the Benevolent Society and Relationships Australia NSW.

Hollonds was born in Tampere, Finland and travelled to Australia with her family in 1958. Growing up in the North Shore area of Sydney, Hollonds spoke Finnish at home and English at school. Hollonds has two daughters.

References

1957 births
Living people
Children's Ombudsmen
Ombudsmen in New Zealand
Australian chief executives
People from Tampere